A fabliau (plural fabliaux) is a comic, often anonymous tale written by jongleurs in northeast France between c. 1150 and 1400. They are generally characterized by sexual and scatological obscenity, and by a set of contrary attitudes—contrary to the church and to the nobility. Several of them were reworked by Giovanni Boccaccio for the Decameron and by Geoffrey Chaucer for his Canterbury Tales. Some 150 French fabliaux are extant, the number depending on how narrowly fabliau is defined. According to R. Howard Bloch, fabliaux are the first expression of literary realism in Europe.

Some nineteenth-century scholars, most notably Gaston Paris, argue that fabliaux originally came from the Orient and were brought to the West by returning crusaders.

History and definition of the genre
The fabliau is defined as a short narrative in (usually octosyllabic) verse, between 300 and 400 lines long, its content often comic or satiric. In France, it flourished in the 12th and 13th centuries; in England, it was popular in the 14th century. Fabliau is often compared to the later short story; Douglas Bush, longtime professor at Harvard University, called it "a short story broader than it is long."

The fabliau is remarkable in that it seems to have no direct literary predecessor in the West, but was brought from the East by returning crusaders in the 12th century. The closest literary genre is the fable as found in Aesop "and its eastern origins or parallels," but it is less moral and less didactic than the fable.  The word is a northern French diminutive from fable.." In terms of morality it is suggested to be closer to the novel than to the parable: "the story is the first thing, the moral the second, and the latter is never suffered to interfere with the former." Still, according to Robert Lewis, "some two-thirds of the French fabliaux have an explicit moral attached to them."

The earliest known fabliau is the anonymous Richeut (c. 1159–1175); one of the earliest known writers of fabliaux is Rutebeuf, "the prototype of the jongleur of medieval literature."

The genre has been quite influential: passages in longer medieval poems such as Le Roman de Renart as well as tales found in collections like Giovanni Boccaccio's Decamerone and Geoffrey Chaucer's Canterbury Tales have their origin in one or several fabliaux. Additionally, the medieval church also found use for the fabliau form. Noting its popularity, the church turned to their own form of minstrelsy similar to the fabliau that espoused "worthy thoughts" rather than the "ribaldry" a more typical fabliau would couch its moral in.

When the fabliau gradually disappeared, at the beginning of the 16th century, it was replaced by the prose short story, which was greatly influenced by its predecessor. Famous French writers such as Molière, Jean de La Fontaine, and Voltaire owe much to the tradition of the fabliau.

Characteristics

Cast of characters, audience
Typical fabliaux contain a vast array of characters, including cuckolded husbands, rapacious clergy, and foolish peasants, as well as beggars, connivers, thieves, and whores. Two groups are often singled out for criticism: the clergy and women. The status of peasants appears to vary, based on the audience for which the fabliau was being written. Poems that were presumably written for the nobility portray peasants (vilains in French) as stupid and vile, whereas those written for the lower classes often tell of peasants getting the better of the clergy.

The audience for fabliaux is estimated differently by different critics. Joseph Bédier suggests a bourgeois audience, which sees itself reflected in the urban settings and lower-class types portrayed in fabliaux. On the other hand, Per Nykrog argues that fabliaux were directed towards a noble audience, and concludes that fabliaux were the impetus for literary refreshment.

Subject matter

The subject matter is often sexual: fabliaux are concerned with the elements of love left out by poets who wrote in the more elevated genres such as Ovid, who suggests in the Ars Amatoria (II.704–5) that the Muse should not enter the room where the lovers are in bed; and Chrétien de Troyes, who maintains silence on the exact nature of the joy discovered by Lancelot and Guinevere in Le Chevalier de la Charrette (4676–4684). Lais and fabliaux have much in common; an example of a poem straddling the fence between the two genres is Lecheor.

Fabliaux derive a lot of their force from puns and other verbal figures; "fabliaux . . . are obsessed with wordplay." Especially important are paranomasia and catachresis, tropes which disrupt ordinary signification and displace ordinary meanings—by similarity of sound, for instance, one can have both "con" and "conte" ("cunt" and "tale") in the same word, a common pun in fabliaux.

Bacon is one of the commonest foodstuffs in, and a common subject in, the fabliaux.

Form
The standard form of the fabliau is that of Medieval French literature in general, the octosyllable rhymed couplet, the most common verse form used in verse chronicles, romances (the romans), lais, and dits. They are generally short, a few hundred lines; Douin de L'Avesne's Trubert, at 2984 lines, is exceptionally long.

Authors and tales
Famous writers of fabliau include Jean Bodel, Garin, Gautier le Leu, Rutebeuf, Enguerrant le Clerc d'Oisi and Douin de L'Avesne.

Some representative tales:

Gombert et les deus clers
A well-known storyline is found in "Gombert et les deus clers" ("Gombert and the two clerks"). Two traveling clerks (students) take up lodging with a villain, and share the bedroom with Gombert, his beautiful wife, and their two children—one teenage girl, and one baby. One of the clerks climbs into bed with the teenage daughter and, promising her his ring, has his way with her; the other, while Gombert is "ala pissier" ("gone pissing", 85), moves the crib with the baby so that Gombert, on his return, lies down in the bed occupied by the clerks—one of whom is in bed with his daughter, while the other is now having sex with Gombert's wife, who thinks it's Gombert come to pleasure her. When the first clerk returns to his bed where he thinks his friend still is, he tells Gombert all about his adventure: "je vien de fotre / mes que ce fu la fille a l'oste" ("I've just been fucking, and if it wasn't the host's daughter", 152–53). Gombert attacks the first clerk, but ends up being beaten up by both.

The tale is found practically unchanged in Boccaccio's Decamerone and in Geoffrey Chaucer's "The Reeve's Tale".

L'enfant de neige
In "L'enfant de neige" ("The snow baby"), a black comedy, a merchant returns home after an absence of two years to find his wife with a newborn son. She explains one snowy day she swallowed a snowflake while thinking about her husband, which caused her to conceive. Pretending to believe the "miracle", they raise the boy until the age of 15 when the merchant takes him on a business trip to Genoa. There, he sells the boy into slavery. On his return, he explains to his wife that the sun burns bright and hot in Italy; since the boy was begotten by a snowflake, he melted in the heat.

Bérangier au lonc cul (Bérangier of the long arse)

De Bérangier au lonc cul is a medieval French fabliau. There are two versions of the fabliau: one by Guerin and one anonymous. In summary, the story begins when a rich earl marries his daughter off to a "young peasant" and deems him a knight. The knight abandons the code of chivalry and lazes around for the first ten years of the marriage. When his wife, tired of his demeaning attitude and lazy nature, speaks of the greatness of the knights in her family, the husband decides to prove himself a worthy knight. He dresses in armor and goes into the forest on horseback. Once in the forest, he hangs his shield on the lowest branch of a tree and beats it until it looks as if it endured a great battle. The knight returns to his wife, shows her his bruised armor, and gloats about his victories. After a few trips into the forest, the wife begins to wonder why the knight himself is unscathed while his armor is in shambles. The next day, she suggests he take servants with him. When he refuses, the lady dresses in a full body suit of armor and follows him into the forest. When she sees him beating his own shield, she steps into sight and threatens to kill him for his dishonor to chivalry. The knight does not recognize his wife's voice. He begs for "pity" and offers to do anything to avoid conflict. His wife, disguised as a mighty knight, gives him the option of jousting her, in which he will surely die, or kissing her arse. Out of cowardice, the knight chooses to kiss her arse. She hops off her horse and pulls down her pants. While the knight should have recognized her female genitalia, he remarks that she has a long arse. Before she leaves, she tells him, "I'm Bérangier of the Long Ass, Who puts shame to the chickenhearted." The wife returns home and sleeps with a valiant knight. When her husband arrives from the forest, he rebukes her. However, that was his last demeaning remark to her. She tells him she met Bérangier and learned of her husband's cowardice. To protect his own name, the knight is forced to succumb to his wife's wishes. Her cleverness leads her to do as she pleased for the rest of her life, and her husband lives in shame.

Other examples
Other popular fabliaux include:

"La vielle qui graissa la patte de chevalier" ("The old woman who paid the knight for favors.")
"Le Pauvre Clerc" ("The poor clerk")
"Le Couverture partagée" ("The shared covering")
"Le Pretre qui mangea les mûres" ("The priest who ate mulberries")
"La crotte" ("The turd")
"Le Chevalier qui fit les cons parler" ("The Knight who made cunts speak") by Guèrin
(Dit de) La vieille Truande ("The old beggar woman") 
"Du prestre ki abevete" ("The priest who peeked") by Guèrin

See also
Anglo-Norman literature
Medieval literature
Aarne–Thompson classification system
Motif-Index of Folk-Literature

References

Bibliography

Cole, William. First and Otherwise Notable Editions of Medieval French Texts Printed from 1742 to 1874: A Bibliographical Catalogue of My Collection. Sitges: Cole & Contreras, 2005.

Further reading

A New English translation of 69 fabliaux: 

Bloch, R. Howard. (1986). The Scandal of the Fabliaux.  Chicago:  The University of Chicago Press.

Lacy, Norris J. (1998).  Reading Fabliaux.  Birmingham:  Summa Publications, Inc.
 (four fabliaux in English translation)

External links

 Bibliographic dataset of fabliaux in modern English translations
 English translations of fabliaux related to Chaucer's tales 
 Recueil général et complet des fabliaux des 13e et 14e siècles, a collection of fabliaux edited by Anatole de Montaiglon and Gaston Raynaud (1872) at the Internet Archive: volumes 1, 2, 3, 4, 5, and 6.

 
12th-century introductions